Benzyl cyanide (abbreviated BnCN) is an organic compound with the chemical formula C6H5CH2CN. This colorless oily aromatic liquid is an important precursor to numerous compounds in organic chemistry.

Preparation
Benzyl cyanide can be produced via Kolbe nitrile synthesis between benzyl chloride and sodium cyanide and by oxidative decarboxylation of phenylalanine.

Benzyl cyanides can also be prepared by arylation of silyl-substituted acetonitrile.

Reactions
Benzyl cyanide undergoes many reactions characteristic of nitriles. It can be hydrolyzed to give phenylacetic acid or it can be used in the Pinner reaction to yield phenylacetic acid esters. Hydrogenation gives β-phenethylamine. 

The compound contains an "active methylene unit".  Bromination occurs gives PhCHBrCN. A variety of base-induced reactions result in the formation of new carbon-carbon bonds.

Uses
Benzyl cyanide is used as a solvent and as a starting material in the synthesis of fungicides (.e.g. Fenapanil), fragrances (phenethyl alcohol), antibiotics, and other pharmaceuticals. The partial hydrolysis of BnCN results in 2-phenylacetamide.

Pharmaceuticals
Benzyl cyanide is a useful precursor to numerous pharmaceuticals. Examples include:

Antiarrhythmics (e.g. disopyramide)
Antidepressants: E.g. Milnacipran & Lomevactone
Antihistamines (e.g. levocabastine (para-fluoro), Pheniramine & Azatadine.
Antitussives (e.g. isoaminile, oxeladin, butethamate, pentapiperide, and pentoxyverine)
Diuretics (e.g. triamterene)
Hypnotics (e.g. alonimid and phenobarbital) & Phenglutarimide
Spasmolytics (e.g. pentapiperide and drofenine)
Stimulants (e.g. methylphenidate)
Opioids (e.g. ethoheptazine, pethidine, and phenoperidine) & methadone

Regulation
Because benzyl cyanide is a useful precursor to numerous drugs with recreational use potential, many countries strictly regulate the compound.

United States
Benzyl cyanide is regulated in the United States as a DEA List I chemical.

China
Benzyl cyanide is regulated in People's Republic of China as a Class III drug precursor since 7 June 2021.

Safety
Benzyl cyanide, like related benzyl derivatives, is an irritant to the skin and eyes.

See also
Bromobenzyl cyanide

References

External links
 EPA Chemical Profile for phenylacetonitrile

Nitriles
Benzyl compounds